The Moco-II RNA motif is a conserved RNA structure identified by bioinformatics.  However, only 8 examples of the RNA motif are known.  The RNAs are potentially in the 5' untranslated regions of genes related to molybdenum cofactor (Moco), specifically a gene that encodes a molybdenum-binding domain and a nitrate reductase, which uses Moco as a cofactor.  Thus the RNA might be involved in the regulation of genes based on Moco levels.  Reliable predictions of Moco-II RNAs are restricted to deltaproteobacteria, but a Moco-II RNA might be present in a betaproteobacterial species.  The Moco RNA motif is another RNA that is associated with Moco, and its complex secondary structure and genetic experiments have led to proposals that it is a riboswitch.  However, the simpler structure of the Moco-II RNA motif (see diagram) is less typical of riboswitches.  Moco-II RNAs are typically followed by a predicted rho-independent transcription terminator.

References

External links
 

Cis-regulatory RNA elements